Malapata is a 2017 Portuguese mystery comedy film directed by Diogo Morgado, co-written by brothers duo Diogo Morgado and Pedro Morgado. The film stars Rui Unas and Marco Horácio in the main lead roles. The film was released on 16 March 2017. The film was mostly shot and set in Algarve.

Synopsis 
Two best friends Carlos (Rui Unas) and Artur (Marco Horácio) play the lottery to challenge their luck. The unlikely happens and they eventually become millionaires. Being driven by enthusiasm, they begin to live according to their newfound possibilities experiencing luxuries which they only dreamt of. The worst picture is that they witness the worst day of their lives with constant bad luck and unprecedented unexpected sequence of events.

Cast 

 Rui Unas as Carlos
 Marco Horácio as Artur
 Mário Bomba as Chefe
 Diogo Morgado as Barbosa
 Helder Agapito as João
 René Barbosa as Homem da Cela
 Luciana Abreu as Ana

References

External links 

 

2010s comedy mystery films
2010s Portuguese-language films
Portuguese comedy films
2017 comedy films
Films shot in the Algarve